Tina Vukov (born 22 December 1988) is a Croatian singer.

Music career
At the age of fourteen Vukov signed a record deal with Croatia Records. In early 2004 she participated at Dora 2004, the selection show to decide Croatia's Eurovision Song Contest 2004 entry with the song "Tuga dolazi kasnije". Placing eighth in the first semi-final she failed to advance to the final. Two years later, in 2006, Vukov participated at Dora 2006 with the song "Il treno per Genova". She placed first in the first semi-final and later placed third in the final. Later that year Vukov's debut album Tuga dolazi kasnije was released.  Vukov participated at Dora for a third time in 2007 with the song "Tata". In the same year she won her first Porin Award in the Best Female Vocal Performance category for "Il treno per Genova". 

On 17 December 2021, Vukov was announced as one of the acts to perform at Dora 2022 with the song "Hideout".

Discography

Albums

Singles

References

External links

Croatian women singers
Living people
1988 births
Croatian pop singers
Musicians from Rijeka
Croatian pop musicians